Lemu may refer to:

People
 Ahmed Lemu (1929–2020), Nigerian scholar
 Aisha Lemu (died 2019), Nigerian scholar
 Hassan Lemu, Nigerian politician
 Massa Lemu, Malawi artist

Places
 Lemu, Finland